storia is Kalafina's fifth single. The title track is the opening theme song of NHK's Rekishi Hiwa Historia, a historical documentary series. The single was also available as a limited edition release, containing a bonus DVD.

Track listing

CD

Limited edition DVD

Charts

References

External Links 

 Storia - Single by Kalafina on Apple Music

2009 singles
Songs written by Yuki Kajiura
Kalafina songs
SME Records singles
2009 songs